The 2017 Ghanaian Premier League is the 61st season of top professional association football in Ghana. The season began on 12 February. Wa All Stars are the defending champions coming off their first league title. The eventual winners Aduana Stars were crowned champions during a special coronation match with Berekum Chelsea. They have automatically qualified for the CAF Champions League next year.

Teams

The Ghanaian Premier League comprises 16 sides, of which the bottom three will be relegated to the Division One.

Stadia and locations

League table

Positions by round

Top scorers

Updated to games played on 22 October 2017

References

Ghana Premier League seasons
Ghanaian Premier League
Ghanaian Premier League
1
1